Duggan is an unincorporated community in Wright County, in the U.S. state of Missouri.

History
A post office called Duggan was established in 1891, and remained in operation until 1906. The community has the name of the local Duggan family.

References

Unincorporated communities in Wright County, Missouri
Unincorporated communities in Missouri